Lakeside is a suburb of Johannesburg, South Africa. It is located adjacent to Modderfontein in the City of Johannesburg Metropolitan Municipality.

References

Johannesburg Region F
Townships in Gauteng